The British Museum (No. 2) Act 1824 (5 Geo 4 c 60) was an Act of the Parliament of the United Kingdom.

The whole Act was repealed by section 13(5) of, and Schedule 4 to, the British Museum Act 1963.

See also
British Museum Act
Halsbury's Statutes

References

United Kingdom Acts of Parliament 1824
British Museum Act 1824 (No. 2)
1824 in London